Emile Sheng (born 5 January 1968) is a Taiwanese politician. He was the Minister of the Council for Cultural Affairs from 2009 to 2011.

Education
Sheng obtained his bachelor's degree in diplomacy from National Chengchi University and doctoral degree in political science from Northwestern University in the United States.

Early career
Sheng was the chief executive officer of the 2009 Summer Deaflympics organizing committee in Taipei in 2009.

Council of Cultural Affairs
On 17 November 2011, Sheng tendered his resignation after he was criticized for organizing an extravagant musical to celebrate the 100th anniversary of the National Day of the Republic of China which cost NT$215 million.

References

1968 births
Living people
Taiwanese Ministers of Culture
National Chengchi University alumni